Neoregelia johannis is a species of flowering plant in the genus Neoregelia. This species is endemic to Brazil.

Cultivars

 Neoregelia 'Autumn Leaves'
 Neoregelia 'Avalanche'
 Neoregelia 'Bertie'
 Neoregelia 'Big Flamingo'
 Neoregelia 'Buccaneer'
 Neoregelia 'Carol Johnson'
 Neoregelia 'DeRolf'
 Neoregelia 'Dreamworthy'
 Neoregelia 'Earthrose'
 Neoregelia 'Exotica Pink Panther'
 Neoregelia 'Fairchild'
 Neoregelia 'Florida'
 Neoregelia 'Foster's Bronze Speckled'
 Neoregelia 'Foster's Pink Tip'
 Neoregelia 'Foster's Red Tip'
 Neoregelia 'French's Cruenta'
 Neoregelia 'Golden Gem'
 Neoregelia 'Green Jewels'
 Neoregelia 'Joey'
 Neoregelia 'Karamea Indian Chief'
 Neoregelia 'Karamea Raspberry Crush'
 Neoregelia 'King Kameahameha'
 Neoregelia 'Lady Killer'
 Neoregelia 'Lady Linda'
 Neoregelia 'Lavender Flair'
 Neoregelia 'Little Julie'
 Neoregelia 'Maricela'
 Neoregelia 'Overture'
 Neoregelia 'Passion'
 Neoregelia 'Peregrine'
 Neoregelia 'Pink Cup'
 Neoregelia 'Pink Tip(s)'
 Neoregelia 'Pride of Place'
 Neoregelia 'Red Band'
 Neoregelia 'Red Baron'
 Neoregelia 'Red Best'
 Neoregelia 'Royal Flush'
 Neoregelia 'Royal Grande'
 Neoregelia 'Samson'
 Neoregelia 'Sendero'
 Neoregelia 'Songlines'
 Neoregelia 'Strawberry Blush'
 Neoregelia 'Summer Wind'
 Neoregelia 'Takizawa Princeps'
 Neoregelia 'Tapestry'
 Neoregelia 'Tops'
 Neoregelia 'Triumph'
 Neoregelia 'Vulkan'
 Neoregelia 'White Joe'
 Neoregelia 'White Johannis'
 × Neomea 'Shooting Star'

References

BSI Cultivar Registry Retrieved 11 October 2009

johannis
Flora of Brazil
Taxa named by Élie-Abel Carrière